Kungliga tennishallen (English: Royal Tennis Hall) is a tennis venue at  Lidingövägen 75 in Stockholm, Sweden. The stadium was built in October 1943 and has a capacity of 5,000. Kungliga tennishallen, now a hard-court surface, remains the venue for the men's Stockholm Open tournament which was first held in 1969. In 1975 the venue was the host of the year-end Masters tennis tournament as well as the Davis Cup final between Sweden and Czechoslovakia.

Other activities
The Volvo PV444/544 was launched at the Kungliga tennishallen in September 1944.

It was the site on 15 April 1962 of the fight between former world heavyweight boxing champion Ingemar Johansson and Dutch champion Wim Snoek.

Various music concerts have been held at Kungliga including Rosita Serrano, Louis Armstrong, David Bowie, the Beatles, Led Zeppelin and the Rolling Stones.

See also
 List of tennis stadiums by capacity

References

External links 

 Kungliga Lawn-tennisklubben
 Wikimapia
 Kungliga tennishallen imagine int
 Kungliga tennishallen
 Kungliga tennishallen 2006
 Kungliga tennishallen 2006 imagine 2

Tennis venues in Sweden
Indoor arenas in Sweden
Sport in Stockholm
Sports venues completed in 1943
1943 establishments in Sweden
1975 Davis Cup